Everly John "Jack" Workman (July 2, 1899, Loudonville, Ohio – December 27, 1982, Santa Barbara, California) was an American atmospheric physicist, known for the Workman-Reynolds effect,
 discovered in 1950 by him and his colleague Stephen E. Reynolds, State Engineer of New Mexico from 1955 to 1990.

Education and career
E. John Workman graduated in 1924 with a bachelor's degree from Whitman College. In his graduating class were Walter Brattain, Walker Bleakney, and Vladimir Rojansky. Workman received his Ph.D. in 1930 from the University of Virginia. His Ph.D. thesis was published in Physical Review. As an NRC Fellow, during the years from 1930 to 1933 he worked at the Bartol Research Foundation of the Franklin Institute in Philadelphia and then at Caltech in Pasadena. From 1933 to 1946 he was a professor in the physics department of the University of New Mexico (UNM) and in his third year there became the head of the department. During those years he was often on leave of absence from his academic duties so that he could carry out specific research projects. In 1936 he was elected a Fellow of the American Physical Society. In 1941 the United States Government appointed him Director of Research Projects.

In 1946 Workman resigned from the University of New Mexico (UNM) in a dispute with the UNM's new president and was hired by the New Mexico School of Mines (which years later was renamed the New Mexico Institute of Mining and Technology). Shortly after being hired, Workman became the interim president of the New Mexico School of Mines and after three years in the interim presidency became the tenured president. He presided over the construction of the Langmuir Laboratory for Atmospheric Research on a site on South Baldy at an altitude of 3240 meters in the Magdalena Mountains. The construction of the laboratory was finished in the summer of 1963.

In 1965 he retired from the New Mexico Institute of Mining and Technology in order to help establish the University of Hawaii at Hilo's Cloud Physics Laboratory. In 1970 he retired as director of the Cloud Physics Laboratory and went to live in Santa Barbara, where he died in 1982.

Selected publications

References

External links
 
 
 
 

1899 births
1982 deaths
20th-century American physicists
Atmospheric physicists
Whitman College alumni
University of Virginia alumni
University of New Mexico faculty
Fellows of the American Physical Society
New Mexico Institute of Mining and Technology
University of Hawaiʻi people